Lüthi is a surname. Notable people with the surname include:

 Alfred Lüthi (born 1961), retired Swiss ice hockey player
 Benjamin Lüthi (born 1988), Swiss footballer
 Ernst Lüthi (born 1954), retired Swiss ice hockey player
 Fred Lüthi (born 1930), Swiss middle-distance runner
 Friedrich Lüthi (1850–?), Swiss sports shooter
 Hans Lüthi (born 1939), former Swiss cyclist
 Harry B. Luthi (born 1933), American businessman and politician
 Kathrin Lüthi (born 1969), Swiss sprinter
 Kurt Lüthi (1923–2011), Swiss theologian  
 Randall Luthi (born 1955), American politician
 Robert Lüthi (born 1958), retired Swiss footballer
 Severin Lüthi (born 1976), Swiss tennis coach and former player
 Thomas Lüthi (born 1986), Swiss motorcycle racer
 Urs Lüthi (born 1947), Swiss artist

See also
Lüthi und Blanc, Swiss German language television drama serial (soap opera)

German-language surnames